Sphere Origins is an Indian television production company based in Mumbai and owned by Sunjoy Waddhwa. It produces television shows, television films, animation shows, and web-series for various channels. Some of its notable works include: Saat Phere: Saloni Ka Safar, Balika Vadhu, Saraswatichandra, Ek Tha Raja Ek Thi Rani, and Pandya Store.

Current productions

Former productions

Regional shows

Telefilms

References

External links
 Official Website
Mass media companies based in Mumbai
Television production companies of India
Entertainment companies of India
Mass media companies established in 2012
Indian companies established in 2012
2012 establishments in Maharashtra